The Nearsighted School Teacher was an early short comedy film released in 1898. It stars Augusta Selmer as a young lady.

Plot
In this case it is the schoolmaster who comes to grief. He is seated at this desk busily engrossed in private business and letting his students run riot. One of the youngsters causes great merriment by tying an artificial spider to a ruler, and shaking it in front of the schoolmaster's face.

External links

1898 films
American silent short films
American black-and-white films
1898 comedy films
Silent American comedy films
Films about teacher–student relationships
American comedy short films
1898 short films
1890s American films